Elia (post-1974 , pre-1974 ) is a village in Cyprus, located east of Lefka. De facto, it is under the control of Northern Cyprus.

References

Communities in Nicosia District
Populated places in Lefke District